Urs Fäh (born 15 April 1964) is a Swiss equestrian. He competed in two events at the 1996 Summer Olympics.

References

External links
 

1964 births
Living people
Swiss male equestrians
Olympic equestrians of Switzerland
Equestrians at the 1996 Summer Olympics
Place of birth missing (living people)